Matthew Conrath (born August 11, 1989) is a former American football defensive end. In 2012, he signed with the St. Louis Rams as an undrafted free agent. He played college football at Virginia.

College career
He played college football at Virginia. He finished college with a total of 182 tackles, 10.5 sacks, 10 pass deflections and 4 forced fumbles.

In his freshman season, he registered 35 tackles, 3 sacks, 3 pass deflections and a Forced fumble.

In his sophomore season, he had 45 tackles along with 2 sacks and 3 pass deflections.

In his junior season, he had 36 tackles, 2.5 sacks, one pass deflection and a Forced fumble.

In his senior season, he had a career best 66 tackles, 3 sacks, 3 pass deflection along with 2 forced fumbles.

Professional career

St. Louis Rams
On May 8, 2012, he signed with the St. Louis Rams as an undrafted free agent. He was waived during final cuts on August 30, 2014. He joined the Rams practice squad on August 31, 2014. He was called up to the active roster on September 11, 2014 to replace the injured Chris Long. He was released on September 15, 2014 in response to the impending roster move of bringing the suspended Stedman Bailey back to the active roster. He re-signed with their practice squad shortly after.

Pittsburgh Steelers
On January 9, 2015, Conrath signed a future/reserve contract with the Pittsburgh Steelers. He was released on September 5, 2015.

References

External links
St. Louis Rams bio
Virginia Cavaliers bio

1989 births
Living people
American football defensive tackles
Virginia Cavaliers football players
St. Louis Rams players
Pittsburgh Steelers players
Players of American football from Virginia
Players of American football from Chicago